Rodolfo Elizondo Torres (born July 18, 1946 in Durango) is a Mexican politician affiliated with the .

Elizondo Torres holds a bachelor's degree in administration from the Monterrey Institute of Technology and Higher Education (ITESM).

Political career
Elizondo has been a member of the PAN since the early 1980s.  In 1983 he was elected municipal president (mayor) of Victoria de Durango.  In 1986 and again in 1992 he unsuccessfully ran for Governor of Durango.

President Vicente Fox designated Elizondo first as presidential spokesperson and then, on July 29, 2003 as Secretary of Tourism.

Mexican President elect Felipe Calderón re-designated Elizondo as Secretary of Tourism for his Administration. He left this position in 2010.

In 2009 he was responsible for launching the "Welcome Back" campaign to regain the trust of travelers affected by the Swine Flu scare. He re-activated cruise ship arrivals to Mexican ports only one month after the swine flu threat became public.

References

1946 births
Living people
Politicians from Durango
National Action Party (Mexico) politicians
Municipal presidents in Durango
Members of the Chamber of Deputies (Mexico)
Members of the Senate of the Republic (Mexico)
Mexican Secretaries of Tourism
Mexican people of Basque descent
Monterrey Institute of Technology and Higher Education alumni
20th-century Mexican politicians
21st-century Mexican politicians
People from Durango City